A 2011 special election filled the vacancy in California's 36th congressional district after the resignation of incumbent Jane Harman on February 28, 2011; Harman vacated her seat in the U.S. House of Representatives to become head of the Woodrow Wilson International Center for Scholars.

The special primary election occurred on May 17, 2011. Democrat Janice Hahn received the highest number of votes, with Republican Craig Huey taking second place. Because no candidate received more than 50 percent of the vote in the primary, a special general election was held on July 12, 2011, between the top two vote recipients. The runoff election was won by Janice Hahn.

Background and procedures
An election was called to fill the rest of Harman's term, which ends January 2013.  An all-party primary was held on May 17.  Since no candidate received more than 50% of the vote, the top two primary finishers, regardless of party, met in a run-off on July 12.

The special election was held under California statutes regarding special elections and not under California's newly in force Proposition 14, which does not apply to special elections.

Candidates in the general election
 Janice Hahn, Democratic Party
 Craig Huey, Republican Party

Candidates in the primaries

Democratic Party
 Dan Adler, businessman from Los Angeles
 Debra Bowen, Secretary of State of California from Marina Del Rey
 Loraine Goodwin, physician/arbitrator/teacher
 Janice Hahn, Los Angeles City Councilwoman from San Pedro
 Marcy Winograd, teacher and community organizer from Venice

Republican Party
 Kit Bobko, Hermosa Beach City Councilman and former Mayor
 Stephen Eisele, Marina del Rey businessman
 Mike Gin, Redondo Beach Mayor
 Craig Huey, Rolling Hills Estates businessman
 George Newberry, businessman
 Mike Webb, Redondo Beach City Attorney

Peace and Freedom Party
 Maria E. Montaño, teacher

Libertarian Party
 Steve Collett, certified public accountant

Independent
 Michael T. Chamness, consultant
 Katherine Pilot, longshore office clerk
 Matthew Roozee, executive at 20th Century Fox

Polling

Primary election

 Commissioned by the Bowen campaign

General election

Polling

  Commissioned by Daily Kos and the SEIU

Bowen/Hahn runoff

 Commissioned by the Bowen campaign
 Commissioned by the Progressive Change Campaign Committee

Results

Primary

General

See also 
 2011 United States House of Representatives elections

References

External links
Janice Hahn for Congress
Craig Huey for Congress

California 2011 36
California 2011 36
2011 36 Special
California 36 Special
United States House of Representatives 36 Special
United States House of Representatives 2011 36